Colnbrook is a village in the Slough district in Berkshire, England. It lies within the historic boundaries of Buckinghamshire, and straddles two distributaries of the Colne, the Colne Brook and Wraysbury River. These two streams have their confluence just to the southeast of the village.

Colnbrook forms the greater part of the civil parish of Colnbrook with Poyle (see also Poyle). Junctions of the M4 and M25 are near the village.  To the east is Longford, London, and Bedfont and Stanwell which abut the south of London Heathrow Airport.

Colnbrook with Poyle is a suburban parish with significant industrial units, logistical premises and open land.  The parish was created on 1 April 1995 as an amalgamation of Colnbrook from Iver to the north and the smaller Poyle from an unparished area of Stanwell to the south-east. At the 2011 census the whole civil parish had a population of 6,157 living in 2,533 homes.

History
Mentioned in William the Conqueror's Domesday Book, Colnbrook is on the Colne Brook, a tributary of the River Colne, hence Colnbrook. Coaching inns were the village's main industry. In 1106 the first one was founded by Milo Crispin, named the Hospice (subsequently the 'Ostrich', probably by way of corruption of the original name), the third oldest in England. By 1577 Colnbrook had no fewer than ten coaching inns. Colnbrook's High Street was on the main London to Bath road and turn off point for Windsor and was used as a resting point for travellers.

One 14th-century landlord, Jarman of the Ostrich Inn, installed a large trap door under the bed in the best bedroom located immediately above the inn's kitchen. The bed was fixed to the trap door and the mattress securely attached to the bedstead, so that when two retaining iron pins were removed from below in the small hours of the morning, the sleeping guest was neatly decanted into a boiling cauldron. In this way more than 60 of his richer guests were murdered silently and with no bloodshed. Their bodies were then disposed of in the River Colne. The murder of a wealthy clothier, Olde Cole or Thomas of Reading, proved to be Jarman's undoing in that he failed to get rid of Cole's horse, leading to his confessing. Jarman and his wife were hanged for robbery and murder. The inn is reportedly haunted and has been subject to investigations by the Sussex Paranormal Research Group and Most Haunted. On an episode of "Ghosthunters International" that aired on 21 July 2010, it is mentioned that the Jarman murders at the Ostrich Inn were the inspiration for the story of "Sweeney Todd."

Colnbrook is also the place where Richard Cox (a retired brewer), in 1825, first grafted the Cox's Orange Pippin apple at his orchard named The Lawns.

A traditional coaching history has led to no fewer than four inns or public houses remaining, three in Colnbrook, one in Poyle.

Administrative history
Colnbrook has a complicated administrative history.  The village was historically divided by the Colne Brook between the ancient parish of Stanwell in Middlesex in the east, and the parishes of Horton and Langley Marish in Buckinghamshire in the west.  The parish vestries provided traditional poor relief and road maintenance but lay in the 19th century in different Poor Law Unions.  Stanwell became part of Staines Rural District in 1894 and Staines Urban District in 1930. The Buckinghamshire parishes joined Eton Rural District in 1894.

In 1965 the eastern part of Colnbrook was transferred to Surrey with the rest of Staines Urban District.  In 1974 Staines Urban District was absorbed into the new borough of Spelthorne. In 1974 most of the parish of Horton was transferred to the new borough of Windsor and Maidenhead in Berkshire, but the western part of Colnbrook remained in Buckinghamshire and was added to the parish of Iver, in the South Bucks district.  Colnbrook was finally united on 1 April 1995, when the present combined parish of Colnbrook with Poyle was formed and added to the borough of Slough in Berkshire.  That was the county's last boundary change before Berkshire County Council was abolished to be replaced by six unitary authorities. When the county council was abolished in April 1998 the borough became more important for local government; however a Berkshire Fire and Rescue service persists, as do ceremonial roles, judicial roles and sporting competitions.

Geography
Colnbrook (with Poyle) is at the eastern end of the borough of Slough and is directly west of the M25 motorway which separates it from Heathrow Airport in the London Borough of Hillingdon in Greater London and the borough of Spelthorne in Surrey. The river is unusual for its regional park (and walk) and seven mouths (distributaries).

Economy
The town's industrial estates are important in fields such as transportation, food and drinks manufacture, warehousing and distribution and despite almost all being in Poyle, landlords have mostly preferred to let premises under the name Colnbrook – but not all, such as Coca-Cola. Beside the Greater London boundary and a historic part of Stanwell which forms the southern part of London Heathrow Airport, it is also equidistant between nearby accessible junctions of the M4 and M25 and a suburban parish with significant industrial/logistical buildings and open land.

Politics
Colnbrook is in the Windsor constituency and its Member of Parliament is Adam Afriyie (Conservative).

Demography
At the 2011 census the whole civil parish had a population of 6,157 living in 2,533 homes, giving a density of 10.9 people per hectare (approximately a quarter of the density of the borough as a whole and just under one half of the average for England).

Transport
Colnbrook was before the M4 along the Roman-origin A4 (previously the Bath road) as well as to Windsor or Maidenhead by way of Slough, and had been a convenient halting-place for travellers before the introduction of railways.

Local bus services are operated by London United who run services from the main village to Hounslow and First Berkshire & The Thames Valley who run the remainder of the services.

Abandoned railway

Colnbrook has a disbanded railway line running into West Drayton, formerly carrying passenger traffic, then for carrying materials for building Heathrow Airport Terminal 5. Colnbrook railway station was closed in 1965 under the Beeching Axe. This railway line formerly continued to Staines-upon-Thames.  Efforts are periodically made to re-use the southern part of it for a Heathrow Airtrack rail link from the counties south of London to Heathrow Airport.

Nearest places

References

External links
 Colnbrook with Poyle Parish Council website
 Colnbrook Views - news and discussion portal for residents of Colnbrook with Poyle
 Colnbrook Village Website - no longer updated
 http://www.colnbrookbaptistchapel.co.uk

Villages in Berkshire
Slough